Statistics of Bulgarian State Football Championship in the 1933 season.

Overview
It was contested by 13 teams, and Levski Sofia won the championship.

First round

|}

Quarter-finals

|}

Semi-finals

|}

Final

References
Bulgaria - List of final tables (RSSSF)

Bulgarian State Football Championship seasons
1
1
Bul
Bul